Freedom Yachts was the maker of the Freedom (sail) and Legacy (power) yacht brands. The Freedom sailboats have unstayed rigs, meaning that the mast is freestanding and not supported by the normal set of wires called standing rigging.  Garry Hoyt, a champion sailor and noted maverick, created the unstayed rigs to give "freedom" from the inefficient sail shapes of traditional sloop rigs as well as to give "freedom" from the compression and maintenance issues associated with standing rigging. A known issue with this style of mast, however, is that in rough seas it can break loose, causing a potential holing (pounds through the bottom of the hull). This is commonly due to the tangs that hold it in place failing. The masts are made of carbon fiber and are set well forward on the boat. This means most of the sail area is contained in the mainsail. Jib sails can either be overlapping or self-tending.

Gary Hoyt founded Freedom Yachts in 1976 with the Freedom 40. All the boats were built by Tillotson Pearson for Freedom Yachts. 

Hoyt sold Freedom Yachts to Tillotson-Pearson in 1985 after some slow years. He used naval architects from the Herreshoff design offices for his early designs and in the early 1980s commissioned a 39 feet pilothouse design from Ron Holland. Tillotson-Pearson brought Gary Mull on board as designer for a new series of great sailing, conventional looking boats. David Pedrick designed for the (again) new owners starting in the mid 1990s after Tillotson-Pearson Composites sold the yacht division off.

Boats produced
Boats produced under company name include:

Freedom 40 AC - 1976
Freedom 40 CC - 1976
Freedom 28 Cat Ketch - 1979
Freedom 33 - 1979
Freedom 25 - 1981
Freedom 35 Cat Ketch - 1981
Freedom 44 Cat Ketch - 1981
Freedom 21 - 1982
Freedom 32 - 1983
Freedom 39 - 1983
Freedom 39 PH - 1983
Freedom 29 - 1984
Freedom 36 - 1985
Freedom 36 Cat Ketch - 1985
Freedom 28 - 1986
Freedom 30 - 1986
Freedom 42 - 1987
Freedom 45 AC - 1987
Freedom 45 CC - 1987
Freedom 27 - 1989
Freedom 38 - 1989
Freedom 32-2 - 1992
Freedom 35 - 1993
Freedom 40/40 - 1993
Freedom 24 - 1994
Independence 20 - 1999

References

External links 
 Freedom Yachts website archives on archive.org

American boat builders
Yacht building companies